Penupatruni Adinarayana Rao (21 August 1915 – 19 August 1991) was an Indian music director, film producer, lyricist and play writer. He co-founded "Aswini Pictures" with Akkineni Nageswara Rao and produced some movies in Telugu and Tamil. Later, he produced several blockbuster Telugu films under his own production house, Anjali Pictures, named after his actress wife, Anjali Devi. He also composed and produced music for several Tamil and Hindi films.

According to the music critic V. A. K. Rangarao,
"Adinarayana Rao is credited for introducing Hindustani music in contemporary flavour and simplified orchestration, and thereby impressing both laymen audience as well cognoscenti. It is this music that survives him enthralling all the music lovers".

Memorable music compositions from Rao are: "Rajasekhara Neepai Moju Theera Leduraa" in the film Anarkali released in 1955, "Piluvakuraa Alugakuraa" in the film Suvarna Sundari released in 1957, "Telugu Veera Levaraa Deeksha Booni Sagara" and "Vastaadu Naraju" in the film Alluri Seetarama Raju released in 1974 and all songs including "Ghana Ghana Sundara" in Bhakta Tukaram, released in 1973. One of his most popular compositions in Hayi hayiga Amani Saage (Telugu), Kuhu Kuhu bole Koyaliya(Hindi), Thesulavuthe (Tamil).

Music directors such as Satyam, T. V. Raju, M. Ranga Rao,"JosephKrishna" and Laxmikant–Pyarelal worked under him as assistant directors.

Life 
Adinarayana Rao was born in 1915 in Kakinada of East Godavari district in Andhra Pradesh to Penupatruni Krishnayya Gowd and Penupatruni
Anasuya. He completed his matriculation in Kakinada.

He started his film career as a child artiste at the age of six, under Rajarajeswari Naatya Mandali's baton playing the roles of mythological characters such as "Narada" and "Savitri". Later, he studied classical music under Patrayani Sitaramsastry in Saluru. By age of 12, he played many musical instruments and had shown his talent in both music as a composer, and on stage as a playwright.

Theatre 
He was well known in Kakinada theatre circle, with plays like Black Market, Vasanta Sena and Veedhi Gaayakulu, with which he still continued after entering the film industry and was affectionately given a nickname "Abbayi Garu". The play Street Singers written by him was admired, and his wife Anjali Devi received a gold medal and a citation from Sir Arthur Hope, then governor of the Madras Presidency in 1943. He fine-tuned his skills to become a well known artiste while working under the 'Burmah Shell Amateurs Troupe', through the famous 'Young Mens Happy Club', which produced stalwarts from the Telugu film industry like Relangi, S. V. Ranga Rao, Gandikota Jagannatham and Anjali Devi. Here he met his future wife Anjali Devi.

Film 
He and S. V. Ranga Rao made their debut into the film industry with the film Varudhini in 1946. Adinarayana Rao wrote lyrics and composed music for two songs in that film. He wrote lyrics and composed music for two more films. He got a break with the film Gollabhama (1947) directed by C. Pullaiah, in which his wife Anjali Devi made her debut. He was the music director for the film Palletoori Pilla in 1950. He married Anjali Devi in 1948, and they had two sons. His granddaughter Saila Rao is also an actress.

He was so generous to promote his assistant Dholak Satyam as Co Music Director for film Bhakta Kannappa. His authenticity,profound knowledge in conducting music for interludes & back ground score with numerous instruments based on pure Hindustani classical music ragas fetched him status of distinctive musician who achieved the feat of using most instruments in Telugu film Industry.

During the 1980s, he mainly composed music and wrote lyrics under Padmalaya Studios for the actor Krishna until the former's death in 1991.

Aswini Pictures 
Adinarayana Rao founded "Aswini Pictures", together with Akkineni Nageswara Rao and makeup artist K. Gopala Rao, to produce movies like "Maayalamaari" in 1951 in Telugu, "Mayakkaari" in Tamil, and "Annadhata" in 1954, for which he wrote lyrics and composed music.

Anjali Pictures 
He started a production house 'Anjali Pictures' in 1951, using the name of his wife after parting ways with Aswini Pictures. He produced some of the blockbusters in the film industry like Paradesi in 1952 in Telugu, which was directed by L. V. Prasad, Poongottai in Tamil, Anarkali in 1955, Suvarna Sundari in 1957 and Bhakta Tukaram in 1973. In all these movies, his wife Anjali Devi acted as the lead heroine. Most of the movies he produced had Akkineni Nageswara Rao as a lead actor.

He also produced movies in Hindi such as Phoolon Ki Sej in 1964 and Suvarna Sundari, for which he wrote the script (1957).

Filmography

Producer

Music director 
 Gollabhama in 1947
 Palletoori Pilla in 1950.
 Maayalamaari in 1951.
 Mayakkari in 1951.
 Pardesi in 1953.
 Poongothai in 1953.
 Annadata in 1954.
 Anarkali in 1955.
 Suvarna Sundari in 1957.
 Manaalane Mangaiyin Baakkiyam in 1957.
 Adutha Veettu Penn in 1960.
 Runanubandham in 1960.
 Swarnamanjari in 1962.
 Mangaiyar Ullam Mangatha Selvam in 1962.
 Phoolon Ki Sej in 1964.
 Sati Sakkubai in 1965.
 Ammakosam in 1970
 Agni Pareeksha in 1970.
 Mosagallaku Mosagadu in 1971
 Pedda Koduku in 1972.
 Bhakta Tukaram in 1973.
 Alluri Seetharama Raju in 1974.
 Mahakavi Kshetrayya in 1976.
Bhakta Kannappa in 1976
 Kannavari Illu in 1978.
Chandipriya in 1980.

Writer 
 Suvarna Sundari in 1957.

Awards 
He won Nandi Award for Second Best Feature Film - Silver - Mahakavi Kshetrayya (1976)
 Bombay Journalist Association Nationwide Best Music Director Award for film Suvarna Sundari.

Adinarayana Rao Award 
Anjali Devi launched the Adinarayana Rao Award (using her husband's name) beginning in 2011. Noted playback singer P. Susheela was the first recipient of the award.

References

External links 
 http://www.chakpak.com/celebrity/adinarayana-rao-p./movies/17831
 https://www.imdb.com/company/co0116468/
 http://www.saigan.com/heritage/flmmusic/adinr.html
 https://www.imdb.com/name/nm0654891/

1915 births
1991 deaths
Telugu film producers
Indian male dramatists and playwrights
Telugu-language lyricists
Telugu film score composers
Musicians from Andhra Pradesh
Screenwriters from Andhra Pradesh
People from Kakinada
Film producers from Andhra Pradesh
20th-century Indian musicians
20th-century Indian dramatists and playwrights
20th-century Indian male writers
20th-century Indian screenwriters